Agriotes sputator is a species of click beetle, commonly known as the common click beetle. The adult beetle is brown and inconspicuous, and the larvae live in the soil and are known as wireworms. They are agricultural pests that devour the roots and underground parts of many crops and other plants.

Description
The head and pronotum are bluntly pointed and the antennae are as long as the total length of the head and pronotum. The front edge of the pronotum is brownish ginger, and the whole pronotum is covered by fine puncture marks. The abdomen is brownish black, the wing covers reddish brown tinged with yellow, and the antennae and legs are pale reddish brown. The pronotum and wing covers are covered in dense, short greyish hairs. The larva is known as a wireworm and lives in the soil. The centre of the mandible has a small tooth for gnawing.

Distribution and habitat
The common click beetle is absent from the far north but is found in the rest of Europe, in Asia Minor, in northern Mongolia and North Africa. It has been inadvertently introduced into North America where it is present in isolated localities near the east coast, particularly in Nova Scotia. The larvae are particularly prevalent in grassland and cereal crops but are polyphagous and eat the underground parts of a large number of plant species.

Life cycle
The adults are active for one or two months from late spring onwards. About one hundred eggs are laid in batches,  beneath the soil and hatch after about two weeks. The larvae develop in the soil for two to four years. They feed on seeds and seedlings and the new tillers of cereal crops, and gnaw their way into roots, finding their food by smell. They feed when the soil temperature exceeds  and need moist soil. They are killed by dry conditions or temperatures below about  but compensate by moving down through the soil to a meter (yard) or so beneath the surface. They can survive for a long time without feeding. When fully-grown, the larvae pupate in late summer in the soil. The adults emerge two to three weeks later. The insects overwinter as adults and as larvae, the whole life cycle taking up to five years to complete.

Ecology
Adult common click beetles are more active in the afternoon and evening. They feed on the leaves of grasses and also on pollen, and are often seen on the flower-heads of umbelliferous plants. The larvae are eaten by birds such as rooks, crows and starlings, particularly just after ploughing, and are also preyed on by insects such as ground beetles. They are also subject to attack by parasitic insects and bacterial and fungal pathogens.

Economic significance
The common click beetle is one of the most harmful common agricultural pest insects; many crops are affected by wireworms especially cereals, maize, sunflower, sugar beet, potato and peanut. Particular damage is done to germinating seed and seedlings. Control measures include crop rotation, thorough soil cultivation, which exposes the larvae to predators, chemical treatments and growing less-susceptible varieties.

References

Elateridae
Beetles of Africa
Beetles of Asia
Beetles of Europe
Beetles described in 1758
Taxa named by Carl Linnaeus